Ettrick is a small town in inland Otago, in the South Island of New Zealand.

Geography
Ettrick is located on the Clutha River and State Highway 8 south of Roxburgh and five kilometres northwest of the small settlement of Millers Flat. Like many other settlements in the area, all of Ettrick's streets are named after towns in the Scottish Borders.

History
Ettrick was founded by Scottish settlers during the Central Otago goldrush in the 1860s, and was named after the Ettrick Valley in Scotland. Ettrick was one of the first places in New Zealand where settlers started to grow apples. Today the main income is from farming, sheep and beef, Dairy and a dwindling number of fruit growers, mainly apple.

The town also has a quaint tearoom, which caters to visitors and was the background for a Toyota Hilux advertisement in 2011.

Demographics
Ettrick is described by Statistics New Zealand as a rural settlement. It is part of the much larger Teviot Valley statistical area. 

Ettrick had a population of 171 at the 2018 New Zealand census, a decrease of 3 people (-1.7%) since the 2013 census, and a decrease of 3 people (-1.7%) since the 2006 census. There were 75 households. There were 102 males and 69 females, giving a sex ratio of 1.48 males per female. The median age was 49 years (compared with 37.4 years nationally), with 15 people (8.8%) aged under 15 years, 24 (14.0%) aged 15 to 29, 90 (52.6%) aged 30 to 64, and 42 (24.6%) aged 65 or older.

Ethnicities were 84.2% European/Pākehā, 1.8% Māori, 14.0% Pacific peoples, and 3.5% Asian (totals add to more than 100% since people could identify with multiple ethnicities).

Although some people objected to giving their religion, 35.1% had no religion, 52.6% were Christian, and 1.8% were Hindu.

Of those at least 15 years old, 12 (7.7%) people had a bachelor or higher degree, and 33 (21.2%) people had no formal qualifications. The median income was $25,000, compared with $31,800 nationally. The employment status of those at least 15 was that 87 (55.8%) people were employed full-time and 24 (15.4%) were part-time.

"McEttrick"
In 2009, New Zealand's only McDonald's-themed museum opened to the public in Ettrick, boasting the largest collection of McDonald's paraphernalia in the Southern Hemisphere.

Alan Garthwaite, the collector and owner of the museum, has been collecting McDonald's knick-knacks for over 25 years. His collection consists of burger boxes, cups, hats, toys, watches, badges, dolls and uniforms, some dating back 40 years.

References

External links

Populated places in Otago